Agustin de Luque and Coca was a Spanish military general and political war minister and director general of the Civil Guard.

Biography

He fought in the Third Carlist War and was stationed in Melilla and Cuba during the Spanish-American War, where he was promoted to Major General.

He was linked to republicanism through Manuel Ruíz Zorrilla. He worked as Chief of Staff in the Ministry of War, where he became a Minister four times (1905; 1906–1909; 1911 and 1912–1915). He was Senator of the provinces of Palencia and Lugo from 1905 to 1908, to later be appointed senator for life in 1909.

He was Director General of the Civil Guard on two occasions; between October 30, 1913, and December 10, 1915, and between April 20, 1917, and June 26, 1917. He is responsible for the approval of the Mandatory Military Service Law. The 6 of October 1920 the Ministry of War issued a decree providing for the cessation of Lieutenant General Agustín Luque and Coca in the office of general commander of the Corps and headquarters Invalids and their place in the reserve for fulfilling the statutory age.

In 1925 he was appointed by the dictator Miguel Primo de Rivera as the president of the commission that drew up the project to create the National Service for Physical, Citizen and Pre-military Education.

References

Bibliography

Ficha en el Senado

1850 births
1937 deaths
Spanish generals
Spanish military personnel of the Spanish–American War
Spanish military personnel of the Third Carlist War (Governmental faction)
Civil Guard (Spain)